La gran fiesta (in English, The Great Party) is a 1985 Puerto Rican drama film, written and directed by Marcos Zurinaga, based on a story by Ana Lydia Vega. The film was selected as the Puerto Rican entry for the Best Foreign Language Film at the 59th Academy Awards, but was not accepted as a nominee.

The film chronicles the celebration of the last high-class party held at the Antiguo Casino de Puerto Rico before it was handed down to the United States military.

Cast
 Daniel Lugo as José Manuel
 Cordelia González as Raquel
 Miguel Ángel Suárez as Vázquez
 Luis Prendes as Don Manuel González
 Laura Delano as Rita Inés
 Raúl David as Don Miguel de la Torre
 Carlos Cestero as Ángel Luis
 Ivonne Coll as Doña Tula
 Maruja Mas as Doña Tere
 Sully Diaz as Mari Tere
 Raúl Juliá as Adolfo
 Julián Pastor as Don Antonio Jiménez
 Guy Paizy as Henry Berger
 Fernando Quiñones as Luis Muñoz Marín
 E.G. Marshall as Judge Cooper
 Raúl Carbonell as M.C.
 David Ortiz Angleró as The Narrator

See also
 Cinema of Puerto Rico
 List of films set in Puerto Rico
 List of submissions to the 59th Academy Awards for Best Foreign Language Film
 List of Puerto Rican submissions for the Academy Award for Best Foreign Language Film

References

External links
 

1985 films
1985 drama films
Puerto Rican films
1980s Spanish-language films